
Gmina Gorzów Śląski is an urban-rural gmina (administrative district) in Olesno County, Opole Voivodeship, in south-western Poland.

Villages
Apart from the town of Gorzów Śląski, Gmina Gorzów Śląski contains the villages and settlements of Budzów, Dębina, Gola, Jamy, Jastrzygowice, Kobyla Góra, Kozłowice, Krzyżańcowice, Nowa Wieś Oleska, Pakoszów, Pawłowice Gorzowskie, Skrońsko, Uszyce and Zdziechowice.

Neighbouring gminas
Gmina Gorzów Śląski is bordered by the gminas of Byczyna, Kluczbork, Łubnice, Olesno, Praszka, Radłów and Skomlin.

Twin towns – sister cities

Gmina Gorzów Śląski is twinned with:
 Fehérvárcsurgó, Hungary
 Landsberg, Germany

References

Gorzow Slaski
Olesno County